The 1906 Maryland Aggies football team represented Maryland Agricultural College (later part of the University of Maryland) in the 1906 college football season. In their second and final season under head coach Fred K. Nielsen, the Aggies compiled a 5–3 record and were outscored by all opponents, 98 to 73. Coach Nielsen had a full-time job with the State Department while coaching football.

Schedule

References

Maryland
Maryland Terrapins football seasons
Maryland Aggies football